Doug Hollie (born December 15, 1960) is a former American football defensive end. He played for the Pittsburgh Maulers in 1984, the Oakland Invaders in 1985 and for the Seattle Seahawks from 1987 to 1988.

References

1960 births
Living people
American football defensive ends
SMU Mustangs football players
Pittsburgh Maulers players
Oakland Invaders players
Seattle Seahawks players
Players of American football from Detroit
People from Highland Park, Michigan